Thomas Henry Bell (21 March 1895 – 16 April 1955) was an Australian rules footballer who played with Essendon in the Victorian Football League (VFL).

Notes

External links 

		

1895 births
1955 deaths
Australian rules footballers from Victoria (Australia)
Essendon Football Club players
North Melbourne Football Club (VFA) players